Epilobium pallidum is a species of flowering plant in the evening primrose family known by the common name largeflower spike-primrose. It is native to western United States, where it grows in moist areas in northern California, Oregon, and Idaho. It is an annual herb producing a narrow, upright stem up to 60 centimeters long lined with narrow oval leaves each up to 5 centimeters in length. The inflorescence atop the stem bears several flowers and hairy, leaflike bracts. Each flower has four bilobed petals each up to about a centimeter long and bright pink in color. The fruit is a beaked capsule between 1 and 2 centimeters long containing a row of tiny seeds.

External links
Jepson Manual Treatment
Photo gallery

pallidum